Sir Bassingbourne Gawdy (19 May 1560 – 17 May 1606), of West Harling, Norfolk, was an English lawyer and judge, knight, and Member of Parliament.

Biography 
He was the son of Bassingbourne Gawdy of West Harling, Norfolk and Anne (died 1587), daughter of John Wootton of North Tuddenham in Norfolk, and relict, successively, of Thomas Woodhouse of Hickling, Norfolk (son of Sir William Woodhouse), and of Henry Reppes of Mendham, Suffolk. He was a brother of Phillip Gawdy (1562–1617).

Having trained for the law at the Inner Temple, he was appointed a Justice of the Peace for Norfolk by 1591 and High Sheriff of Norfolk for 1593–94 and 1601–02. He also served as a deputy lieutenant for Norfolk in 1605. He was a Member of Parliament (MP) for Norfolk in 1601. Later Bassingbourne became the MP of Thetford from 1593 and 1604.

Bassingbourne succeeded his father in 1590 (inheriting his lands at West Harling and nearby Bardwell Hall, Suffolk) and was knighted in 1597.

Bassingbourne died on 17 May 1606, and was buried on 23 May 1606 at West Harling. He was succeeded by his eldest son.

Family 
He first married Anne (baptised 6 October 1567 – died 1594), daughter of Sir Charles Framlingham of Crow’s Hall, Debenham in Suffolk and his wife Dorothy, daughter of Sir Clement Higham, and had three sons by her.  His first wife was buried on 9 June 1594 at West Harling. By his first wife Anne Framlingham, Sir Bassingbourne Gawdy had two sons:

 Framlingham Gawdy (1589–1654), his heir, the father of Sir William Gawdy, the first of the Gawdy baronets of West Harling
Sir Charles Gawdy, the father of Sir Charles Gawdy, the first of the Gawdy baronets of Crow's Hall

His second wife was Dorothy (daughter of Sir Nicholas Bacon of Redgrave, Suffolk), who bore him a further two sons and three daughters. The two were married on 30 April 1595 at Culford, Suffolk. Dorothy, his second wife survived him and in 1609 she married Philip Colby of Culford, at Beccles. In 1621 she died, aged 47. There is a monumental inscription to her in Redgrave church. Children of Sir Bassingbourne Gawdy and Dorothy Bacon: 
 Bassingbourne Gawdy, eldest son by the second wife, baptised at Redgrave 12 August 1596, of Clifford's Inn and of the Middle Temple 1613–1618. A captain, slain at Maestricht in 1632. Married Susan, daughter of Sir Robert Barker of Trimley in Suffolk, at Fornharn St. Martin  in 1624. Susan was buried at St. James, Bury St. Edmunds on 4 August 1661. They had the children John, born 23 August 1626, Bassingbourne, baptised 25 September 1627 at St. Clement's in Ipswich, but who died young, Edmund born in Holland in 1629, Bassingbourne, a posthumous child, born in Holland, who attended Caius College at Cambridge, and Susan of Bury, mentioned in Sir Edmund Bacon's will in 1648.
Bacon Gawdy
Dorothy Gawdy, the wife of Sir Henry Felton of Playford in Sussex, knight and baronet, and the mother of Sir Henry Felton, 2nd Baronet 
Anne Gawdy (1593–1632), a woman noted for her beauty and accomplishments, amongst others by King James I. She was said to have been admired by Prince Charles (1600–1649). In January 1619 the king came to Culford, a house of her grandparents, to see her. "Nann Gawdy" married William Stanhope, M.P., of Linby, Nottinghamshire, in 1624. Their son was the MP,  Sir William Stanhope of Shelford, Nottinghamshire. (1626–1703). John Chamberlain wrote that the following verse and anagram on her name were said to have been written by the Prince:
Heaven's wonder late, but now Earth's glorious ray,
With wonder shines; that's gone, this new and gaye  [Anne Gawdye]
Still gazed on; in this is more than Heaven's light;
Day obscur'd that; this makes the day more bright.

Frances Gawdy

References

1560 births
1606 deaths
People from Harling, Norfolk
High Sheriffs of Norfolk
Knights Bachelor
English MPs 1593
Deputy Lieutenants of Norfolk
English MPs 1601
English MPs 1604–1611
English justices of the peace
English knights
Members of the Parliament of England for Norfolk
Members of the Parliament of England for Thetford